The Reynard 95I is an open-wheel racing car designed and built by Reynard Racing Cars that competed in the 1995 and 1996 IndyCar seasons, notable for winning the first CART race it entered, and later going on to win the constructors' and drivers' titles later that year, being driven by Jacques Villeneuve. The car continued to be raced in the 1996 and 1996-97 Indy Racing League seasons.

References

Indianapolis 500
American Championship racing cars
Reynard Motorsport vehicles